The International Organization for Standardization (ISO ) is an international standard development organization composed of representatives from the national standards organizations of member countries. Membership requirements are given in Article 3 of the ISO Statutes.

ISO was founded on 23 February 1947, and (as of November 2022) it has published over 24,500 international standards covering almost all aspects of technology and manufacturing. It has 811 Technical committees and sub committees to take care of standards development. The organization develops and publishes standardization in all technical and nontechnical fields other than electrical and electronic engineering, which is handled by the IEC. It is headquartered in Geneva, Switzerland, and works in 167 countries . The three official languages of the ISO are English, French, and Russian.

Overview
The International Organization for Standardization is an independent, non-governmental organization, whose membership consists of different national standards bodies. , there are 167 members representing ISO in their country, with each country having only one member.

The organization develops and publishes international standards in all technical and nontechnical fields other than electrical and electronic engineering, which are the responsibility of the International Electrotechnical Commission. , the ISO has developed over 24,676 standards, covering everything from manufactured products and technology to food safety, agriculture, and healthcare.

ISO has 804 technical committees and subcommittees concerned with standards development.

Name and abbreviations 

The letters ISO do not represent an acronym or initialism. The organization provides this explanation of the name:Because 'International Organization for Standardization' would have different acronyms in different languages (IOS in English, OIN in French), our founders decided to give it the short form ISO. ISO is derived from the Greek word  (meaning "equal"). Whatever the country, whatever the language, the short form of our name is always ISO.During the founding meetings of the new organization, however, the Greek word explanation was not invoked, so this meaning may be a false etymology.

Both the name ISO and the ISO logo are registered trademarks and their use is restricted.

History 
The organization that is known today as ISO began in 1926 as the International Federation of the National Standardizing Associations (ISA), which primarily focused on mechanical engineering. The ISA was suspended in 1942 during World War II but, after the war, the ISA was approached by the recently-formed United Nations Standards Coordinating Committee (UNSCC) with a proposal to form a new global standards body.

In October 1946, ISA and UNSCC delegates from 25 countries met in London and agreed to join forces to create the International Organization for Standardization. The organization officially began operations in 23 February 1947.

Structure and organization
ISO is a voluntary organization whose members are recognized authorities on standards, each one representing one country. Members meet annually at a General Assembly to discuss the strategic objectives of ISO. The organization is coordinated by a central secretariat based in Geneva.

A council with a rotating membership of 20 member bodies provides guidance and governance, including setting the annual budget of the central secretariat.

The technical management board is responsible for more than 250 technical committees, who develop the ISO standards.

Joint technical committee with IEC

ISO has a joint technical committee (JTC) with the International Electrotechnical Commission (IEC) to develop standards relating to information technology (IT). Known as JTC 1 and entitled "Information technology", it was created in 1987 and its mission is "to develop worldwide Information and Communication Technology (ICT) standards for business and consumer applications."

There was previously also a JTC 2 that was created in 2009 for a joint project to establish common terminology for "standardization in the field of energy efficiency and renewable energy sources". It was later disbanded.

Membership 

, there are 167 national members representing ISO in their country, with each country having only one member.

ISO has three membership categories,
 Member bodies are national bodies considered the most representative standards body in each country. These are the only members of ISO that have voting rights.
 Correspondent members are countries that do not have their own standards organization. These members are informed about the work of ISO, but do not participate in standards promulgation.
 Subscriber members are countries with small economies. They pay reduced membership fees, but can follow the development of standards.

Participating members are called "P" members, as opposed to observing members, who are called "O" members.

Financing 
ISO is funded by a combination of:
 Organizations that manage the specific projects or loan experts to participate in the technical work
 Subscriptions from member bodies, whose subscriptions are in proportion to each country's gross national product and trade figures
 Sale of standards

International standards and other publications

International standards are the main products of ISO. It also publishes technical reports, technical specifications, publicly available specifications, technical corrigenda, and guides.

International standards
 These are designated using the format ISO[/IEC] [/ASTM] [IS] nnnnn[-p]:[yyyy] Title, where nnnnn is the number of the standard, p is an optional part number, yyyy is the year published, and Title describes the subject. IEC for International Electrotechnical Commission is included if the standard results from the work of ISO/IEC JTC 1 (the ISO/IEC Joint Technical Committee). ASTM (American Society for Testing and Materials) is used for standards developed in cooperation with ASTM International. yyyy and IS are not used for an incomplete or unpublished standard and, under some circumstances, may be left off the title of a published work.

Technical reports
 These are issued when a technical committee or subcommittee has collected data of a different kind from that normally published as an International Standard, such as references and explanations. The naming conventions for these are the same as for standards, except TR prepended instead of IS in the report's name.

For example:
 ISO/IEC TR 17799:2000 Code of Practice for Information Security Management
 ISO/TR 19033:2000 Technical product documentation – Metadata for construction documentation

Technical and publicly available specifications
 Technical specifications may be produced when "the subject in question is still under development or where for any other reason there is the future but not immediate possibility of an agreement to publish an International Standard". A publicly available specification is usually "an intermediate specification, published prior to the development of a full International Standard, or, in IEC may be a 'dual logo' publication published in collaboration with an external organization". By convention, both types of specification are named in a manner similar to the organization's technical reports.

For example:
 ISO/TS 16952-1:2006 Technical product documentation – Reference designation system – Part 1: General application rules
 ISO/PAS 11154:2006 Road vehicles – Roof load carriers

Technical corrigenda
 ISO also sometimes issues "technical corrigenda" (where "corrigenda" is the plural of corrigendum). These are amendments made to existing standards due to minor technical flaws, usability improvements, or limited-applicability extensions. They are generally issued with the expectation that the affected standard will be updated or withdrawn at its next scheduled review.

ISO guides
These are meta-standards covering "matters related to international standardization". They are named using the format "ISO[/IEC] Guide N:yyyy: Title".

For example:
 ISO/IEC Guide 2:2004 Standardization and related activities – General vocabulary
 ISO/IEC Guide 65:1996 General requirements for bodies operating product certification (since revised and reissued as ISO/IEC 17065:2012 Conformity assessment — Requirements for bodies certifying products, processes and services).

Document copyright
ISO documents have strict copyright restrictions and ISO charges for most copies. Some standards by ISO and its official U.S. representative (and, via the U.S. National Committee, the International Electrotechnical Commission) are made freely available.

Standardization process
A standard published by ISO/IEC is the last stage of a long process that commonly starts with the proposal of new work within a committee. Some abbreviations used for marking a standard with its status are:
 PWI – Preliminary Work Item
 NP or NWIP – New Proposal / New Work Item Proposal (e.g., ISO/IEC NP 23007)
 AWI – Approved new Work Item (e.g., ISO/IEC AWI 15444-14)
 WD – Working Draft (e.g., ISO/IEC WD 27032)
 CD – Committee Draft (e.g., ISO/IEC CD 23000-5)
 FCD – Final Committee Draft (e.g., ISO/IEC FCD 23000-12)
 DIS – Draft International Standard (e.g., ISO/IEC DIS 14297)
 FDIS – Final Draft International Standard (e.g., ISO/IEC FDIS 27003)
 PRF – Proof of a new International Standard (e.g., ISO/IEC PRF 18018)
 IS – International Standard (e.g., ISO/IEC 13818-1:2007)

Abbreviations used for amendments are:
 NP Amd – New Proposal Amendment (e.g., ISO/IEC 15444-2:2004/NP Amd 3)
 AWI Amd – Approved new Work Item Amendment (e.g., ISO/IEC 14492:2001/AWI Amd 4)
 WD Amd – Working Draft Amendment (e.g., ISO 11092:1993/WD Amd 1)
 CD Amd / PDAmd – Committee Draft Amendment / Proposed Draft Amendment (e.g., ISO/IEC 13818-1:2007/CD Amd 6)
 FPDAmd / DAM (DAmd) – Final Proposed Draft Amendment / Draft Amendment (e.g., ISO/IEC 14496-14:2003/FPDAmd 1)
 FDAM (FDAmd) – Final Draft Amendment (e.g., ISO/IEC 13818-1:2007/FDAmd 4)
 PRF Amd – (e.g., ISO 12639:2004/PRF Amd 1)
 Amd – Amendment (e.g., ISO/IEC 13818-1:2007/Amd 1:2007)

Other abbreviations are:
 TR – Technical Report (e.g., ISO/IEC TR 19791:2006)
 DTR – Draft Technical Report (e.g., ISO/IEC DTR 19791)
 TS – Technical Specification (e.g., ISO/TS 16949:2009)
 DTS – Draft Technical Specification (e.g., ISO/DTS 11602-1)
 PAS – Publicly Available Specification
 TTA – Technology Trends Assessment (e.g., ISO/TTA 1:1994)
 IWA – International Workshop Agreements (e.g., IWA 1:2005)
 Cor – Technical Corrigendum (e.g., ISO/IEC 13818-1:2007/Cor 1:2008)
 Guide – a guidance to technical committees for the preparation of standards

International Standards are developed by ISO technical committees (TC) and subcommittees (SC) by a process with six steps:
 Stage 1: Proposal stage
 Stage 2: Preparatory stage
 Stage 3: Committee stage
 Stage 4: Enquiry stage
 Stage 5: Approval stage
 Stage 6: Publication stage

The TC/SC may set up working groups (WG) of experts for the preparation of a working drafts. Subcommittees may have several working groups, which may have several Sub Groups (SG).

It is possible to omit certain stages, if there is a document with a certain degree of maturity at the start of a standardization project, for example, a standard developed by another organization. ISO/IEC directives also allow the so-called "Fast-track procedure". In this procedure a document is submitted directly for approval as a draft International Standard (DIS) to the ISO member bodies or as a final draft International Standard (FDIS), if the document was developed by an international standardizing body recognized by the ISO Council.

The first step—a proposal of work (New Proposal) is approved at the relevant subcommittee or technical committee (e.g., SC29 and JTC1 respectively in the case of Moving Picture Experts Group – ISO/IEC JTC1/SC29/WG11). A working group (WG) of experts is set up by the TC/SC for the preparation of a working draft. When the scope of a new work is sufficiently clarified, some of the working groups (e.g., MPEG) usually make open request for proposals—known as a "call for proposals". The first document that is produced, for example, for audio and video coding standards is called a verification model (VM) (previously also called a "simulation and test model"). When a sufficient confidence in the stability of the standard under development is reached, a working draft (WD) is produced. This is in the form of a standard, but is kept internal to working group for revision. When a working draft is sufficiently solid and the working group is satisfied that it has developed the best technical solution to the problem being addressed, it becomes a committee draft (CD). If it is required, it is then sent to the P-members of the TC/SC (national bodies) for ballot.

The committee draft becomes final committee draft (FCD) if the number of positive votes exceeds the quorum. Successive committee drafts may be considered until consensus is reached on the technical content. When consensus is reached, the text is finalized for submission as a draft International Standard (DIS). Then the text is submitted to national bodies for voting and comment within a period of five months. It is approved for submission as a final draft International Standard (FDIS) if a two-thirds majority of the P-members of the TC/SC are in favour and if not more than one-quarter of the total number of votes cast are negative. ISO will then hold a ballot with National Bodies where no technical changes are allowed (yes/no ballot), within a period of two months. It is approved as an International Standard (IS) if a two-thirds majority of the P-members of the TC/SC is in favour and not more than one-quarter of the total number of votes cast are negative. After approval, only minor editorial changes are introduced into the final text. The final text is sent to the ISO central secretariat, which publishes it as the International Standard.

International Workshop Agreements
International Workshop Agreements (IWAs) follow a slightly different process outside the usual committee system but overseen by the ISO, allowing "key industry players to negotiate in an open workshop environment" in order to shape the IWA standard.

Products named after ISO
On occasion, the fact that many of the ISO-created standards are ubiquitous has led to common use of "ISO" to describe the product that conforms to a standard. Some examples of this are:
 Disk images end in the file extension "ISO" to signify that they are using the ISO 9660 standard file system as opposed to another file system—hence disc images commonly being referred to as "ISOs".
 The sensitivity of a photographic film to light (its "film speed") is described by ISO 6, ISO 2240, and ISO 5800. Hence, the speed of the film often is referred to by its ISO number.
 As it was originally defined in ISO 518, the flash hot shoe found on cameras often is called the "ISO shoe".
 ISO 11783, which is marketed as ISOBUS.
 ISO 13216, which is marketed as ISOFIX.

Criticism
With the exception of a small number of isolated standards, normally ISO standards are not available free of charge, but for a purchase fee, which has been seen by some as unaffordable for small open-source projects.

The ISO/IEC JTC 1 fast-track procedures ("Fast-track" as used by OOXML and "PAS" as used by OpenDocument) have garnered criticism in relation to the standardization of Office Open XML (ISO/IEC 29500). Martin Bryan, outgoing convenor of ISO/IEC JTC 1/SC 34 WG1, is quoted as saying:
I would recommend my successor that it is perhaps time to pass WG1’s outstanding standards over to OASIS (Organization for the Advancement of Structured Information Standards), where they can get approval in less than a year and then do a PAS submission to ISO, which will get a lot more attention and be approved much faster than standards currently can be within WG1.

The disparity of rules for PAS, Fast-Track and ISO committee generated standards is fast making ISO a laughing stock in IT circles. The days of open standards development are fast disappearing. Instead we are getting "standardization by corporation".

The computer security entrepreneur and Ubuntu founder, Mark Shuttleworth, commented on the Standardization of Office Open XML process by saying: "I think it de-values the confidence people have in the standards setting process", and alleged that ISO did not carry out its responsibility. He also noted that Microsoft had intensely lobbied many countries that traditionally had not participated in ISO and stacked technical committees with Microsoft employees, solution providers, and resellers sympathetic to Office Open XML:
When you have a process built on trust and when that trust is abused, ISO should halt the process... ISO is an engineering old boys club and these things are boring so you have to have a lot of passion ... then suddenly you have an investment of a lot of money and lobbying and you get artificial results. The process is not set up to deal with intensive corporate lobbying and so you end up with something being a standard that is not clear.

See also

 
 
 
 
  – for sustainability information and linking up with reporting on their 17#GlobalGoals indicators
  – a set of technical standards maintained by the Euro-Asian Council for Standardization, Metrology, and Certification
 
 
  – the Interface Marketing Supplier Integration Institute

ISO divisions 
Technical Committees of the International Organization for Standardization (ISO) include:

  – Terminology and other language and content resources

References

Further reading
 
  MIT Innovations and Entrepreneurship Seminar Series.

External links

 
 Publicly Available Standards, with free access to a small subset of the standards.
 Advanced search for standards and/or projects
 Online Browsing Platform (OBP), access to most up to date content in ISO standards, graphical symbols, codes or terms and definitions.

 
Organisations based in Geneva
Organizations established in 1947
Social responsibility organizations
Technical specifications